Aplastodiscus eugenioi is a species of frog in the family Hylidae.
It is endemic to Brazil.
Its natural habitats are subtropical or tropical moist lowland forests and rivers.
It is threatened by habitat loss.

References

Sources

Aplastodiscus
Endemic fauna of Brazil
Taxonomy articles created by Polbot
Amphibians described in 2005